Cheryl McCulloch (born 1 January 1990) is a Scottish football defender who plays for Partick Thistle Women’s FC in the Scottish Women's Premier League (SWPL), the top-division football league in Scotland.

Club career
McCulloch played at Queen's Park and Hamilton Academical before she joined Glasgow City in February 2014.

International career
McCulloch has represented Scotland at the under-17 and under-19 levels. In July 2015, she was called into training camp for the senior national team.

References

External links 
 Cheryl McCulloch at UEFA.com

1990 births
Living people
Glasgow City F.C. players
Scottish women's footballers
Scottish Women's Premier League players
Women's association football defenders
Hamilton Academical W.F.C. players
Celtic F.C. Women players
Queen's Park F.C. (women) players